Korea Army Academy (Yeongcheon) or KAAY is a military academy of the Republic of Korea Army for training officer cadets. Commonly known as "Choongsungdae" (Hanja: 忠誠臺) as a reference to its loyalty and devotion to the country, it produces the largest number of junior officers in the Korean Army. The current Superintendent of the Academy is Major General Ko Chang-Jun

Campus 
The main campus is located in Yeongcheon, a south district of Gyeongsangbuk-do, South Korea. Certain areas of the campus is open to the public on weekends. Visitors without South Korean citizenship must notify the Academy at least a week in advance to obtain permission for entry.

Admission 
The Academy only accepts students who have completed their 1st and 2nd year of undergraduate studies (or an equivalent qualification recognized by the academy), and trains only junior and senior cadets (i.e. 3rd and 4th year of undergraduate studies).

Education 
All cadets graduate with a bachelor's degree with majors in military science and another chosen major and are commissioned as 2nd lieutenant of the Korean army.
KAAY also actively engages in exchange partnerships with nearby US military units including USAG Daegu, 19th ESC, and Camp Mujuk.

See also 
 Republic of Korea military academies
 Korea Military Academy (ROK Army)
 Korea Air Force Academy 
 Korea Naval Academy
 Korea Army Officer Candidate School
 List of national universities in South Korea
 List of universities and colleges in South Korea
 Education in Korea

References

External links 
 Homepage of the Korea Army Academy (Yeongcheon)

1968 establishments in South Korea
Army installations of the Republic of Korea
Military academies of South Korea
Universities and colleges in North Gyeongsang Province
Yeongcheon